Seduction: Sinatra Sings of Love is a 2009 double disc compilation album by American singer Frank Sinatra.

Released by Rhino just in time for Valentine's Day 2009, Seduction: Sinatra Sings of Love is a good collection of 22 highlights—with an additional ten cuts on the two-disc "deluxe" edition—from Sinatra's Reprise recordings. While there are surely some hits here -- "Some Enchanted Evening," "They Can't Take That Away from Me," "I Get A Kick Out of You," "I've Got You Under My Skin"—what's noteworthy about this collection is that it is not just a recycling of familiar songs, it digs a little deeper into his catalog (even finding a previously unissued "My Funny Valentine") to create a compilation that is not necessarily for aficionados, but rather Sinatra fans who already know the big tunes and want to dig a little deeper. In this regard, it's a worthy compilation, delivering plenty of good music that is both good and fits the seductive mood of the title. This album is dedicated to Sinatra's arranger and conductor, Neal Hefti.

Track listing

Disc one
 "Prisoner of Love" (Russ Columbo, Leo Robin, Clarance Gaskill) - 3:50
 "I've Got You Under My Skin" (Cole Porter) - 3:26
 "My Funny Valentine" [Alternate Version] (Richard Rodgers, Lorenz Hart) - 2:31
 "Witchcraft" (Cy Coleman, Carolyn Leigh) - 2:37
 "All the Way" (Sammy Cahn, Jimmy Van Heusen) - 3:32
 "It Had to Be You" (Isham Jones, Gus Kahn) - 3:53
 "Young at Heart" (Leigh, Johnny Richards) - 2:56
 "Love Is a Many-Splendored Thing" (Paul Francis Webster, Sammy Fain) - 3:54
 "Some Enchanted Evening" (Rodgers, Oscar Hammerstein II) - 3:29
 "(How Little It Matters) How Little We Know" (Leigh, Phil Springer) - 2:23
 "I Get a Kick Out of You" (Porter) - 3:13
 "The Second Time Around" (Cahn, Van Heusen) - 3:09
 "At Long Last Love" (Porter) - 2:41
 "I Concentrate on You" (Porter) - 2:39
 "Then Suddenly Love" (Ray Alfred, Paul Vance) - 2:23
 "They Can't Take That Away from Me" (George Gershwin, Ira Gershwin) - 2:42
 "A Fine Romance" (Dorothy Fields, Jerome Kern) - 2:13
 "More (Theme from Mondo Cane)" (Riz Ortolani, Nino Oliviero, Marcello Ciorciolini, Norman Newell) - 3:01
 "This Happy Madness (Estrada Branca)" (Aloysio de Oliveira, Antonio Carlos Jobim, Gene Lees) - 3:02
 "Teach Me Tonight" (Cahn, Gene DePaul) - 3:48
 "All the Way Home" (Teddy Randazzo) - 3:54
 "That's All" (Bob Haymes, Alan Brandt) - 3:21

Disc two
 "The Look of Love" (Cahn, Van Heusen) - 2:44
 "Secret Love" (Webster, Fain) - 3:54
 "I Wish You Love" (Léo Chauliac, Charles Trenet, Albert Beach) - 2:56
 "I Like to Lead When I Dance" (Cahn, Van Heusen) - 3:09
 "Misty" (Erroll Garner, Johnny Burke) - 2:41
 "Stay With Me (Main Theme from The Cardinal)" (Leigh, Jerome Moross) - 3:04
 "Talk To Me Baby" (Robert E. Dolan, Johnny Mercer) - 2:58
 "For Once in My Life" (Ron Miller, Orlando Murden) - 2:50
 "All of You" (Porter) - 1:42
 "I Had the Craziest Dream" (Mack Gordon, Harry Warren) - 3:13

References

2009 compilation albums
Frank Sinatra compilation albums